The 1972 Bowling Green Falcons football team was an American football team that represented Bowling Green University in the Mid-American Conference (MAC) during the 1972 NCAA University Division football season. In their fifth season under head coach Don Nehlen, the Falcons compiled a 6–3–1 record (3–1–1 against MAC opponents) and outscored their opponents by a combined total of 184 to 127.

The team's statistical leaders included Reid Lamport and Joe Babics, each with 430 passing yards, Paul Miles with 1,024 rushing yards, and Roger Wallace with 242 receiving yards.

Schedule

References

Bowling Green
Bowling Green Falcons football seasons
Bowling Green Falcons football